Cancellaria darwini is a species of sea snail, a marine gastropod mollusk in the family Cancellariidae, the nutmeg snails.

Description
This species was discovered in 1970.

Distribution

References

Cancellariidae
Gastropods described in 1970